Van Buren Township is one of twelve townships in Pulaski County, Indiana, United States. As of the 2010 census, its population was 911 and it contained 386 housing units.

Van Buren Township was organized in 1842, and named for Martin Van Buren (1782–1862), eighth President of the United States (1837–1841).

Geography

Cities, towns, villages
 Star City

Unincorporated towns
 Thornhope at 
(This list is based on USGS data and may include former settlements.)

Adjacent townships
 Harrison Township (north)
 Union Township, Fulton County (northeast)
 Wayne Township, Fulton County (east)
 Harrison Township, Cass County (southeast)
 Boone Township, Cass County (south)
 Cass Township, White County (southwest)
 Indian Creek Township (west)
 Monroe Township (northwest)

Cemeteries
The township contains these four cemeteries: Buck, Independent Order of Odd Fellows (now known as Star City West Cemetery), Mull and Victor Chapel.

Major highways
  U.S. Route 35

Education
 Eastern Pulaski Community School Corporation

Van Buren Township residents may obtain a free library card from the Pulaski County Public Library in Winamac.

Political districts
 Indiana's 2nd congressional district
 State House District 16
 State Senate District 18

References
 United States Census Bureau 2008 TIGER/Line Shapefiles
 United States Board on Geographic Names (GNIS)
 IndianaMap

External links
 Indiana Township Association
 United Township Association of Indiana

Townships in Pulaski County, Indiana
Townships in Indiana